Alex Baldaccini (born 4 April 1988) is an Italian male mountain runner who won WMRA World Cup in 2017.

See also
 European Athlete of the Month (winner October 2012)

References

External links
 
 

1988 births
Living people
Italian male mountain runners
Italian male long-distance runners
Italian male cross country runners
Snowshoe runners
21st-century Italian people